Callionymus sublaevis, the Australian filamentous dragonet, is a species of dragonet native to the southwestern Pacific Ocean.  It is popular as a gamefish.  This species grows to a length of  TL.

References 

S
Taxa named by Allan Riverstone McCulloch
Fish described in 1926